Bambusa gibba is a species of Bambusa bamboo.

Distribution 
Bambusa gibba is endemic from southeast China, especially of Jiangxi province, to northern Vietnam.

References 

gibba
Flora of Jiangxi
Flora of Vietnam